Christopher Ship is an English journalist and presenter, working for ITV News. Since 2017, he has been the Royal Editor.

Early life and education
Ship was brought up in Southampton in Hampshire, and educated at Bellemoor School for Boys (since renamed Upper Shirley High School), a state comprehensive school in the city, where Craig David was a pupil, followed by the University of Sussex, where he studied Media and French.

Life and career
Ship was appointed senior political correspondent for the ITN-produced service in 2008 - promoted from political correspondent, as part of a reshuffle of ITV's political team.

Since early 2009, Ship has been a presenter of the ITV Weekend News.

Ship was given a new title of Deputy Political Editor in 2012.

On 13 December 2016 it was announced Ship is to become Royal Editor from 2017, replacing the retiring Tim Ewart.

Since September 2019 he has also been a occasional relief presenter of the ITV Lunchtime News.

References

External links

English television presenters
ITN newsreaders and journalists
Mass media people from Southampton
Living people
20th-century English non-fiction writers
21st-century English writers
21st-century British journalists
20th-century British journalists
English male journalists
20th-century English male writers
21st-century English male writers
Alumni of the University of Sussex
Year of birth missing (living people)
Place of birth missing (living people)